Drzonowo may refer to the following places:
Drzonowo, Kuyavian-Pomeranian Voivodeship (north-central Poland)
Drzonowo, Kołobrzeg County in West Pomeranian Voivodeship (north-west Poland)
Drzonowo, Szczecinek County in West Pomeranian Voivodeship (north-west Poland)